Looking for Love is a 1964 romantic musical-comedy film starring popular singer Connie Francis.

Plot
Francis plays Libby Caruso, who has spent a whole month trying to get into show business with her singing, yet hasn't succeeded. Libby then decides to retire and get a job where she can meet the right man and get married. She is interested in pursuing Paul Davis (Jim Hutton), whom she meets in the supermarket, but Paul is not interested.

Libby later creates a clothes stand she calls the "Lady Valet". This product interests Paul who wants to promote it. Paul gets Libby on The Tonight Show Starring Johnny Carson to push her products. When Libby mentions that she was formerly a singer, Carson asks her to sing. Libby's singing career takes off, and Paul then becomes interested in Libby. Libby then changes her mind and falls for a young grocer (Joby Baker). Paul then decides to pursue Libby's roommate, Jan (Susan Oliver).

Cast
Much of the supporting cast is from Francis' first screen role, Where the Boys Are (1960). A few celebrity cameos also appear, including Johnny Carson, Danny Thomas, Paula Prentiss, George Hamilton and Yvette Mimieux.  This film was Johnny Carson's first film cameo, and his movie debut.

Reception
Johnny Carson used to joke that Looking for Love was so bad it was transferred to flammable nitrate film stock. In 1987, Gene Siskel and Roger Ebert appeared on The Tonight Show and brought along an alleged clip from their movie review program, in which they reviewed Carson's performance in Looking For Love. Gene slammed Johnny's acting, while Roger gave it a "thumbs up"—after which he admitted that he had been given a million dollars and other prizes for a positive review.

Francis was meant to make a follow-up movie, Pizza for Breakfast, but it was never filmed.

Home media
Looking for Love was released to DVD by Warner Home Video on September 12, 2011 via its Warner Archive DVD-on-demand service available from online retailers.

See also
 List of American films of 1964

References

External links
 Video Captures of Connie Francis Movies screenshots of the film.
 
 
 Looking for Love at Turner Classic Movies
 

1964 films
1964 musical comedy films
1964 romantic comedy films
American musical comedy films
American romantic comedy films
American romantic musical films
Films directed by Don Weis
Metro-Goldwyn-Mayer films
Films produced by Joe Pasternak
1960s romantic musical films
1960s English-language films
1960s American films